Salute the Toff is a 1941 crime thriller novel by the British writer John Creasey. It is the sixth in his long-running featuring the gentleman amateur detective The Toff.

Adaptation
In 1952 it was made into a British film of the same title directed by Maclean Rogers and starring John Bentley, Carol Marsh and Valentine Dyall.

References

Bibliography
 Goble, Alan. The Complete Index to Literary Sources in Film. Walter de Gruyter, 1999.
 Reilly, John M. Twentieth Century Crime & Mystery Writers. Springer, 2015.

1941 British novels
Novels by John Creasey
British crime novels
British thriller novels
Novels set in London
British novels adapted into films
John Long Ltd books